Dr. Chandrakant S. Pandav is an Indian doctor who works on combating the iodine deficiency disorders. He is one of the founding members and regional coordinators for South Asia of International Council for Control of Iodine Deficiency Disorders (IDD). He played a crucial role in the iodisation of salt in India, which has earned him the title of "The Iodine Man of India".

Biography
Dr. Pandav completed his MBBS and MD in Community Medicine from All India Institutes of Medical Sciences, and received his M.Sc with specialization in Health Economics, Clinical Epidemiology and Biostatistics from McMaster University in Hamilton, Ontario. He is a former professor and Head, Centre for Community Medicine(CCM),All India Institute of Medical Sciences(AIIMS),New Delhi. He has travelled over 60 countries. He has special interests in Music Therapy.

Dr. Pandav has been WHO and UNICEF consultant on iodine deficiency disorders since 1983. He was President of Indian Public Health Association from 2010-2013.

Awards and recognition

Padma Shri (fourth highest civilian award in India) (2021)
Mother Teresa Memorial Award (2016)
WHO Public Health Champion (2017)
Dr. M.K. Seshadri Prize, Gold Medal by Indian Council of Medical Research (2000) for contributions in the field of Community Medicine
Fellow at National Academy of Medical Sciences
Fellow at Indian Public Health Association
Fellow at Indian Association of Preventive and Social Medicine
Delhi Ratna Awardee 2022
Chief Mentor, All India Institue of Medical Sciences(AIIMS), Udaipur
 President, Indian Coalition for Control of Iodine Deficiency Disorders( ICCIDD)
Iodine Global Network(IGN), South Asia Coordinator(1986-2020)
Founding Member, International Council for Control of Iodine Deficiency Disorders 1986
Chief Mentor, World Federation for Non Communicable Diseases(NCD)
President, Indian Public Health Association(IPHA) 2010-2013
Vice President, Indian Public Health Association(IPHA) 2004-2009
Member, Rashtriya POSHAN(Prime Minister's Overarching Scheme for Holistic Nutrition) Abhiyan
President, Indian Association of Preventive and Social Medicine(IAPSM), 2007
The Coalition for Food and Nutrition Security(CFNS) chairperson from July 2019-October 2020
Vice President, Trans Asian Chamber of Commerce, India(TACCI)
President, Rainbow Cold Laser Institute, New Delhi
Chairperson, International Integrated Medical Professionals Association (IIMPA), Pune, Maharashtra
Chairperson, Divine Campus Foundation
Chief Mentor, Integrative Global Health And Wellness For Happiness And Peace 
Patron, International Council for Social And Economic Development 
Chief Mentor, Vivekanand Academy, Pune, Maharashtra

References

External links

Living people
Year of birth missing (living people)
20th-century Indian medical doctors
Recipients of the Padma Shri in medicine